Universitatea Craiova may refer to:

University of Craiova, an educational institution in Craiova
CS Universitatea Craiova, a football club from Craiova
FC U Craiova 1948, a football club from Craiova